The World Horror Convention was an annual professional gathering of the World Horror Society and other interested parties that ran annually for 26 years, from 1991 through 2016, before being discontinued.

Site selection
The annual World Horror Conventions were held mostly in the United States or Canada, frequently alternating between the east and west sides of North America. In 2010, the convention was held outside North America for the first and only time, in Brighton, England.

The bids from potential committees were presented to the members of the board of directors of the World Horror Society, who then decided where future conventions would be held. Bids were usually made two years before the specific year (e.g., bids for 2001 were considered in 1999). The Horror Writers Association's Bram Stoker Award ceremony was held in conjunction with the convention for many years, but the HWA now stages the ceremony at its own convention, the Bram Stoker Awards Weekend. The World Horror Convention Grand Master Award was given most years, until the World Horror Convention was discontinued in favor of the annual Bram Stoker Awards Weekend.

Conventions

References

External links
World Horror Convention

Horror fiction
Arts organizations established in 1991
Arts organizations disestablished in 2016
Defunct horror conventions
Defunct multigenre conventions
Defunct science fiction conventions